Shooting glasses are specialized corrective glasses for use in shooting and are used almost exclusively in sport shooting competitions.
Like other glasses, they are worn in front of the eyes to compensate for the shooter's ametropia with optical lenses.

Functions
In contrast to most other eye glasses, shooting glasses usually only have one lens that corrects the ametropia of the  dominant eye, which is used for aiming. This lens is selected in such a way that the maximum visual acuity lies on the font sight line element near the muzzle of the (non-magnifying) open type or diopter and globe type match sight line elements to get three points positioned in three different optical planes in acceptably sharp focus at the same time.
This is necessary because the shooter can influence the weapon and sight line elements and not the target. It is accepted that the target is not seen with maximal visual acuity during the – especially when using open sights used in pistol events and with increasing age – for the human eye difficult task of aligning the target with the front and rear sighting elements.
To avoid eye fatigue and improve balance the non-aiming eye should be kept open. The non-aiming eye can be blocked from seeing distractions by mounting a semi-transparent occluder. This is preferred to pinching the non-aiming eye in order to avoid the undesirable closing of the eyelid of the aiming eye and increased strain on the eyelid muscle.

The corrective lens for the aiming eye is attached to the eyeglasses frame and adjustable in three-dimensional space. This ensures that the aiming eye can look through the glass centrally and axially optimally adjusted to minimize optical distortions and hence distortions to the sighting image. The occluder for the non-aiming eye and other accessories mounted to the frame are also adjustable. The shooter positions the corrective lens correctly in front of his aiming eye and other accessories depending on his posture and preferences when shooting.

Accessories
Accessories mounted on the highly adjustable shooting glasses frames consist of:
 Iris diaphragms to increase the depth of field and reduce reflections.
 Colored transparent insert discs to increase the contrast sensitivity.
 Semi-transparent occluder to block the non-aiming eye from seeing distractions.
 Glare shields to restrain light from the side or from above are considered permitted accessories.

Sporting competitions
In principle, the correction of ametropia is permitted with all suitable means. This also applies to colored discs and iris diaphragms. The use of magnifying aiming optics is not allowed by the International Shooting Sport Federation.

For some shooting competition types, safety glasses are mandatory or expressly recommended as eye protection. Shooting glasses are also permitted as eye protection.

Gallery

References

Corrective lenses
Protective gear
Sports equipment
Shooting sports equipment
Eyewear
Ophthalmology